Blanche Marchesi (4 April 1863 – 15 December 1940) was a French mezzo-soprano and voice teacher best known for her interpretations of the works of Richard Wagner. She was the daughter of Mathilde Graumann Marchesi, a German voice instructor who taught a variety of well-known opera singers, including Emma Eames, Nellie Melba, and Emma Calvé.

Early life and career
Marchesi was born in Paris in February 1863. For her education, she attended boarding schools in Frankfurt, Germany and then Paris.
Although she initially was educated as a violinist, she decided to pursue a singing career in 1881. Her first concert was held at Queen's Hall in 1896. Opera critics at the time criticized her technical skill but praised her interpretive ability. During her career as a voice teacher, Marchesi instructed such singers as British contraltos Muriel Brunskill and Astra Desmond. She premiered a work of Cécile Chaminade in England in the 1890s. Martin Shaw's song "Heffle Cuckoo Fair" is dedicated to her. She held a farewell concert in 1938, two years before her death.

Personal life
Marchesi had two sisters, Thérèse and Stella. Her parents were Mathilde Graumann Marchesi of Frankfurt and Salvatore de Castrone (Marchese di Palermo, hence the stage name Marchesi), who was also an opera singer and a voice instructor. He was also involved as a key figure in the Italian Revolution of 1848 where he initiated the uprising at the Palazzo Raimondi in Milan. She was first married to Baron Alexander Popper von Podhragy, Vienna, with whom she had 3 sons: Leopold, Fritz and Ernst. Leopold was declared enemy of the state by the Nazis and the Democratic Republic of Austria and expropriated. Fritz was killed by Austrian Nazis in 1953 in Austria near Ischgl. Ernst was deported to Dachau and later to Buchenwald, freed and fled to the United States of America. Baron André Anzon-Caccamisi, London, was her second husband as of 1894 with whom she had one son, Baron Jérôme Anzon-Caccamisi, who was murdered by the National Socialists in February 1945 as a Resistance and French intelligence officer in the  Mauthausen-Gusen concentration camp in Austria.

References

Sources
Singer's pilgrimage By Blanche Marchesi
Bach Cantatas

1863 births
1940 deaths
French operatic mezzo-sopranos
Voice teachers
19th-century French women opera singers
20th-century French women opera singers
Women music educators